Abraham Lincoln Freedman (November 19, 1904 – March 13, 1971) was a United States circuit judge of the United States Court of Appeals for the Third Circuit and previously was a United States district judge of the United States District Court for the Eastern District of Pennsylvania.

Education and career

Born in Trenton, New Jersey, Freedman received a Bachelor of Laws from Temple University Beasley School of Law in 1926, immediately entering private practice in Philadelphia, Pennsylvania. While in private practice, Freedman was of general counsel to the Philadelphia Housing Authority from 1938 to 1949 and was of counsel to the Philadelphia Housing Association from 1940 to 1961. He was special counsel for housing to the Pennsylvania Post-War Planning Commission from 1944 to 1946, and was a special counsel to the Redevelopment Authority of Philadelphia from 1946 to 1947. He left private practice to become the city solicitor for Philadelphia from 1952 to 1956, then returned to private practice until 1961.

Federal judicial service

Freedman was nominated by President John F. Kennedy on September 1, 1961, to the United States District Court for the Eastern District of Pennsylvania, to a new seat authorized by 75 Stat. 80. He was confirmed by the United States Senate on September 14, 1961, and received his commission on September 22, 1961. His service terminated on July 6, 1964, due to elevation to the Third Circuit.

Freedman was nominated by President Lyndon B. Johnson on April 15, 1964, to a seat on  the United States Court of Appeals for the Third Circuit vacated by Judge Herbert Funk Goodrich. He was confirmed by the Senate on July 2, 1964, and received his commission on July 2, 1964. His service terminated on March 13, 1971, due to his death.

See also
 List of Jewish American jurists

References

Sources
  Retrieved 2009-05-27.

1904 births
1971 deaths
Judges of the United States District Court for the Eastern District of Pennsylvania
United States district court judges appointed by John F. Kennedy
20th-century American judges
Judges of the United States Court of Appeals for the Third Circuit
United States court of appeals judges appointed by Lyndon B. Johnson
20th-century American lawyers